Henry Alexander Cecil Douglas (1879–1952) was an Australian businessman and politician. He was a Member of the Queensland Legislative Assembly.

Early life
Henry Douglas was born on 8 April 1879 in Brisbane, the son of John Douglas (a Premier of Queensland) and his second wife Sarah (née Hickey).

Politics
At the 1907 election Henry Douglas was elected to the Queensland Legislative Assembly representing the electoral district of Cook. He held the seat until the 1915 election when he was defeated by the Labor candidate Harry Ryan.

Family life

On 28 April 1910, Henry Douglas married Flora Isabel MacDonald at the St Stephen's Catholic Cathedral in Brisbane. However, she died unexpectedly six months later on 7 December at their home in Kangaroo Point following a minor illness.

On 11 February 1914, he married Catherine Cecilia Beirne, daughter of Thomas Beirne (a wealthy businessman and Member of the Queensland Legislative Council) at St Stephen's Cathedral in Brisbane; Joseph Shiel ( Bishop of Rockhampton) officiated.

Later life
Henry Douglas died on 30 August 1952 in Brisbane. He was buried on 1 September 1952 at the Nudgee cemetery following a funeral service at St Agatha's Roman Catholic Church at Clayfield.

References

Members of the Queensland Legislative Assembly
1879 births
1952 deaths
Australian people of English descent
Australian people of Scottish descent
Politicians from Brisbane
Burials at Nudgee Cemetery